Bolton New Houses is a hamlet in Cumbria, England.

See also
List of places in Cumbria
Bolton Low Houses

References

Hamlets in Cumbria
Allerdale